USS Duval County (LST-758) was an LST-542-class tank landing ship built for the United States Navy during World War II. Named after counties in Florida and Texas, she was the only U.S. naval vessel to bear the name.

LST-758 was laid down on 5 June 1944 at Ambridge, Pennsylvania by the American Bridge Company; launched on 25 July 1944; sponsored by Mrs. F. D. Colburn; and commissioned on 19 August 1944.

Service history
During World War II, LST-758 was assigned to the Asiatic-Pacific theater and participated in the assault and occupation of Iwo Jima in February, 1945, and the assault and occupation of Okinawa Guntō in April through June, 1945. Following the war, she performed occupation duty in the Far East until mid-September 1945. LST-758 was decommissioned on 13 July 1946, and recommissioned on 3 November 1950 for service in the Korean War. She saw service in Korea until late November, 1953.  I James E. Thompson went aboard the 758 in November, 1950, and was discharged from it on 1 February 1954.  She was scheduled to leave Korea in July 1953.  When the armistice was signed in June she was held over to return prisoners from Koje Do Island to Inchon.  Pens were built on the tank deck that held 600 prisoners and she made three trips to Inchon.  She sailed to Long Beach, California, in November. On 1 July 1955, the ship was redesignated USS Duval County (LST-758). Following the Korean War, she saw extensive service with the Pacific and Atlantic Fleets through 1969. Duval County was decommissioned on 28 October 1969. Laid up in the Reserve Fleet, the ship was struck from the Naval Vessel Register on 1 November 1976.  After custody was transferred to MARAD for lay up in the National Defense Reserve Fleet, she was sold by MARAD on 18 August 1981; her final fate is unknown.
 
LST-758 earned two battle stars for World War II service and four battle stars in the Korean War.

See also
 List of United States Navy LSTs
 Duval County, Florida
 Duval County, Texas

References

 
 

LST-542-class tank landing ships
World War II amphibious warfare vessels of the United States
Cold War amphibious warfare vessels of the United States
Korean War amphibious warfare vessels of the United States
Ships built in Ambridge, Pennsylvania
Duval County, Florida
Duval County, Texas
1944 ships